The fourth season of Charmed, an American supernatural drama television series created by Constance M. Burge, originally aired in the United States on The WB from October 4, 2001, through May 16, 2002. Airs on Thursdays at 9:00 pm. Paramount Home Entertainment released the complete fourth season in a six-disc boxed set on February 28, 2006. This season also saw the introduction of Rose McGowan as Paige Matthews half-sister to Prue, Piper and Phoebe and a slight alteration of the opening credits, due to the third season departure of Shannen Doherty as Prue.

Cast and Characters

Main 
 Alyssa Milano as Phoebe Halliwell
 Rose McGowan as Paige Matthews / The Evil Enchantress
 Holly Marie Combs as Piper Halliwell
 Brian Krause as Leo Wyatt
 Julian McMahon as Cole Turner
 Dorian Gregory as Darryl Morris

Recurring
 Jennifer Rhodes as Penny Halliwell
 James Read as Victor Bennett
 Finola Hughes as Patty Halliwell
 Krista Allen as The Source's Oracle
 Ben Guillory and Peter Woodward as The Source of All Evil
 Jesse Woodrow as Glen Balland
 Debbi Morgan as The Seer
 Rebecca Balding as Elise Rothman
 Tony Amendola and Michael Des Barres as Dark Priest
 Deborah Kellner as Julie

Guest
 Jordan Bridges as Shane
 James Hong as Zen Master
 Daniel Dae Kim as Yen Lo
 Robert Englund as Gammill
 Charlie Weber as The Prince
 Bethany Joy Lenz as Lady Julia
 Alex Breckenridge as Michelle Miglis
 Patrick Fischler as Foreman
 Cleo King as Tanya
 Ray Wise as Ludlow
 Frances Bay as Old Phoebe Halliwell
 Coolio as Lazarus Demon
 Costas Mandylor as Rick Lang
 Louis Mandylor as Nathan Lang
 Armin Shimerman as Wizard
 Jaime Gomez as Greg Conroy
 Carel Struycken as The Tall Man
 Dakin Matthews as Angel of Destiny
 Bruce Campbell as Agent Jackman
 Michael Des Barres as Dark Priest

Special Musical Guest 
 Dave Navarro
 Rebekah Ryan

Episodes

Notes

References

External links 
List of Charmed season 4 episodes at the Internet Movie Database
 

Charmed (TV series)
Charmed (TV series) episodes
2001 American television seasons
2002 American television seasons

bg:Списък с епизоди на Чародейките#Сезон 4